Antai Subdistrict is a subdistrict in Qing'an County, Suihua, Heilongjiang province, China. , it administers the following three residential neighborhoods:
Qingsheng Community
Qingfeng Community
Qinghe Community

See also 
 List of township-level divisions of Heilongjiang

References 

Township-level divisions of Heilongjiang
Qing'an County